SM Town Live (stylized as SMTOWN LIVE) is a concert tour held by SM Entertainment artists.

Background 
After the successful first joint concert tour on 2008, SM Entertainment announced that it had established its artists to perform concerts abroad on tour titled the SMTOWN LIVE World Tour.

SMTOWN Live '08 

SMTOWN Live '08 was a 2008, first joint concert tour of SMTOWN. The tour started with one show in Seoul in August 2008 and continued to the China and Thailand.

Performers

Shows

SMTOWN Live '10 World Tour 

SMTOWN Live '10 World Tour was a 2010 to 2011 worldwide live concert tour by SMTOWN. The tour started with one show in Seoul in August 2010 and continued to the United States, Japan, China, and France.

Performers

Shows

SMTOWN Live World Tour III 

SMTOWN Live World Tour III was a 2012 to 2013 worldwide live concert tour by SMTOWN. The tour started with one show in United States in May 2012 and continued to China, Japan, South Korea, Indonesia, Singapore, and Thailand

Performers 

{{hidden
| headercss = background: #FFE1E8; font-size: 100%; width: 75%;
| contentcss = text-align: left; font-size: 100%; width: 75%;
| header = Tokyo, Japan (October 26–27, 2013)
| content = Performers
Kangta
BoA
TVXQ
The Grace-Dana & Sunday
Super Junior   
Super Junior-M
f(x) 
J-Min
SHINee 
Girls' Generation
EXO
Leeteuk was absent due to illness.
Yesung was absent due to his active military service.
Siwon was absent due to the filming of his Chinese movie Helios.
Minho was absent due to the filming of his drama Medical Top Team.
Krystal was absent due to the filming of her drama The Heirs
Krystal Was not absent during this tour day as it is proven by video captured of the event. Sulli|Sulli However was due to unknown reasons .
}}

 SMTOWN Live World Tour IV SM Town Live World Tour IV was the 2014 to 2015 worldwide live concert tour by SMTOWN. The tour commenced with one show in Seoul and then continued in Tokyo, Shanghai, Hsinchu.

 Performers 

SMTOWN Live Culture HumanitySMTOWN Live Culture Humanity'' is the worldwide live online concert organised by SMTOWN. The concert was held on January 1, 2021, and broadcast through Facebook, Twitter, V Live, YouTube, TikTok, Beyond Live and KNTV.

Performers

SMTOWN Live 2022: SMCU Express

Performers

References 

12
K-pop concerts